Melody is  a modern English feminine given name taken from the vocabulary word melody, which is ultimately derived from the Greek μελῳδία, melōidía, "singing, chanting").

Popularity
The name has been among the top one thousand names for girls in the United States since 1942 and was the 106th most popular name for American girls in 2020. It has been increasing in popularity in the English-speaking world in recent years. It has been among the top five hundred names for girls in England and Wales since 2003 and among the top three hundred names since 2010. It has also been well used in France and the Netherlands.

Variants in use include the French Mélodie and Mélody and English spelling variants Mellody, Melodee, Melodey, Melodi, and Melodie.

People

People with the given name
 Melody Anderson (born 1955), Canadian-American actress and social worker
 Melody Barnes (born 1964), American lawyer and political advisor who served in the Obama Administration
 Melody Beattie (born 1948), American self-help author
 Melody Brown (born 1984), musician, member of the musical ensemble The 5 Browns
 Melody Chan, American mathematician and violinist
 Melody Currey (born 1950), American politician
 Melody Gardot (born 1985), American musician
 Melody Harris-Jensbach (born 1961), American business executive
 Melody Horrill (born 1968), British-Australian journalist, former TV presenter, communications manager, and author
 Mélody Johner (born 1984) Swiss equestrian
 Melody Kay (born 1979), American actress
 Melody Lacayanga, dancer from So You Think You Can Dance
 Melody McCray-Miller (born 1956), American former state politician
 Melody Perkins (born 1974), American actress, model and dancer
 Melody Thomas Scott (born 1956), American actress
 Melody Thornton (born 1984), American singer and television personality

People with the surname
 Tony Melody (1922-2008), English actor

People with the stage name
 Melody (Belgian singer), Nathalie Lefebvre (born 1977), Belgian singer
 Melody (Brazilian singer), Gabriella Abreu Severino (born 2007), Brazilian singer
 Melody (actress) (born 1982), Burmese actress
 Melody (Japanese singer), stylized as "melody.", Melody Ishihara (born 1982), Japanese pop singer
 Melody (Spanish singer), Melodía Ruiz Gutiérrez (born 1990), Spanish singer
 Melody Trouble Vixen, a female professional wrestler from the Gorgeous Ladies of Wrestling
 Melody, a UK garage MC and member of DJ Pied Piper and the Masters of Ceremonies

Arts, entertainment, and media

Fictional entities
 Melody, a common potoo from Angry Birds 2 who loves to sing, introduced in 2022
 Melody, a character from the manga series Hunter × Hunter
 Melody, a pony character and singer from the TV series My Little Pony Tales
 Melodie the Music Fairy, a character from the book franchise Rainbow Magic
 Princess Melody, a character from the Walt Disney film The Little Mermaid II: Return to the Sea
 Melody-Melody, a character from the 1994 Peanuts special You're in the Super Bowl, Charlie Brown
 Melody Locus, a character in My Life as a Teenage Robot
 Melody Pendras, a main character in the Netlix series Archive 81 & in the podcast on which it is based
 Melody Piper, daughter of the Pied Piper from the fashion doll franchise Ever After High
 Melody Pond, aka River Song, a character in the TV show Doctor Who
 Melody Valentine (also known as Melody Jones), a character in the Josie and the Pussycats franchise

Notes